A Music Gym is membership-based club or cooperative community where musicians (and other artists) share common resources in a shared facility. Such resources are related to music production, music rehearsal, movie production, art galleries, and tools useful for networking with other creative artists. Typically members of the community share the cost of property through some sort of fee, or make some exchange of services live performance, goods (music equipment) or labor to be members of the community.

The Music Gym concept and name were first coined and made popular in 2000 in Boston, Massachusetts by Ryan McVinney, where he and business partner Robert Edward along with a group of musicians and artists converted an old circuit-board factory in a rundown area of Allston into a shared musical facility for a relatively large group of local musicians and artists  . McVinney and others have helped spread the concept from Boston to Austin, Texas, New York City, Canada, England, Lima  Peru, San Francisco, Los Angeles and other various locations across the world. Some Music Gym's operate as for-profit businesses, while some operate as private, non-incorporated clubs run by smaller groups of musicians.

References

External links
 http://www.boston.com/news/globe/living/articles/2004/03/05/a_clause_to_celebrate/
 The Boston Globe, March 5, 2004 - Printed Newspaper
 The Austin Chronicle, FEBRUARY 20, 2009: MUSIC - Printed Newspaper
 http://issuu.com/raremagazine/docs/march2009music
 Rare Magazine, March 2009 - Printed Magazine
 http://www.austinchronicle.com/gyrobase/Issue/column?oid=oid%3A744247
 http://www.governor.state.tx.us/music/directory/studios/rehearsalstudios/
 https://web.archive.org/web/20090718050457/http://sxsw.com/files/u33/09SXSW_MUSIC_venues.pdf
 http://austin.bizjournals.com/austin/potm/2007-01-08/
 http://latimesblogs.latimes.com/music_blog/2009/03/sxsw-wednesday.html
 https://web.archive.org/web/20090606085800/http://www.ryan-nicole.com/news-articles/3-20-2009-SXSW-Fashion-Show.php
 https://www.wired.com/underwire/2009/03/sxsw-dont-miss/
 http://sxsw2009.sched.org/venue/The+Music+Gym/815+E+6th+St,+Austin+TX
 http://www.austinchronicle.com/gyrobase/Issue/column?oid=oid:759081
 https://www.youtube.com/watch?v=H-xoKcvNM98
 http://eastaustinite.wordpress.com/2008/07/21/discussions-the-music-gym/
 http://www.britannica.com/bps/additionalcontent/18/26902317/Celebrations-at-the-Music-Gym
 http://events.austin360.com/austin-tx/venues/show/649453-music-gym-and-lounge
2000 in music
Music venues